Oliver Luterán (born 6 September 2001) is a Slovak professional footballer who plays for Ružomberok as a midfielder.

Club career

MFK Ružomberok
Luterán made his Fortuna Liga debut for Ružomberok against Žilina at pod Dubňom on 6 March 2021, replacing Marek Zsigmund.

References

External links
 MFK Ružomberok official club profile 
 Futbalnet profile 
 
 

2001 births
Living people
Slovak footballers
Association football midfielders
1. FC Tatran Prešov players
FK Poprad players
MFK Ružomberok players
Slovak Super Liga players
2. Liga (Slovakia) players